The 2003 Stan James World Matchplay was a darts tournament held in the Empress Ballroom at the Winter Gardens, Blackpool.

This was the fourth World Matchplay tournament to be sponsored by UK bookmaker Stan James. The tournament ran from 27 July–2 August 2003, and was won by Phil Taylor.

Prize money
The prize fund was £80,000.

Seeds

Results

References

World Matchplay (darts)
World Matchplay Darts